Amer Hiroš (born 10 June 1996) is a Bosnian professional footballer who plays as a left winger for Prva HNL club Šibenik, on loan from Osijek.

Club career

Želježničar
After passing all the youth levels at hometown club Željezničar in two years, Hiroš appeared seven times for the senior team, including one appearance in the 2015–16 Europa League qualifiers against Balzan. In that game, he came on in the 84th minute, replacing Zoran Kokot.

Goražde
In February 2016, Hiroš was loaned to Goražde until the end of the half-season. He signed for Goražde immediately the same summer after his contract with Želježničar expired. He left the club in 2017.

Mladost Doboj Kakanj
In July 2017, Hiroš signed for Bosnian Premier League club Mladost Doboj Kakanj. In Mladost, he showed his qualities, but in January 2019 he was sent on loan to Olimpik until the end of the season. After returning from his loan, Hiroš became a standard member of the first team. After four years, he left the club.

Osijek
In July 2021, Hiroš signed for Croatian Prva HNL club Osijek on a free transfer.

Šibenik
On 25 January 2023, Hiroš signed for Šibenik on loan until the end of season.

Career statistics

Club

References

External links
Amer Hiroš at Sofascore

1996 births
Living people
Footballers from Sarajevo
Bosnia and Herzegovina footballers
Association football forwards
FK Željezničar Sarajevo players
FK Goražde players
FK Mladost Doboj Kakanj players
FK Olimpik players
NK Osijek players
HNK Šibenik players
Expatriate footballers in Croatia
Bosnia and Herzegovina expatriate sportspeople in Croatia
Premier League of Bosnia and Herzegovina players
First League of the Federation of Bosnia and Herzegovina players
Croatian Football League players